Soul of a Banquet is a 2014 American documentary film about Chinese-American restaurateur and chef Cecilia Chiang.  It was directed by Wayne Wang.

Participants
The following people appeared in the documentary:

Cecilia Chiang
Alice Waters
Ruth Reichl

References

External links
 
 
 

American documentary films
2014 documentary films
Films directed by Wayne Wang
2010s English-language films
2010s American films